Mohamad Faris Shah bin Mohd Rosli (born 17 April 1995) is a Malaysian professional footballer who plays as a centre-back for Malaysia Super League club Penang.

Club career

Early career
Faris started his career with Harimau Muda C in 2013. He was also  part of the squad for Malaysia U19 that competed in 2013 AFF U-19 Youth Championship.

Harimau Muda
In 2014, he joined Harimau Muda, which competed in the S.League and made 15 appearances and scored one goal in the league. He also made an appearance in the 2014 Singapore Cup before they were knocked out by Tampines Rovers in penalty shoot-out. For the 2015 season he made six appearances and scored one goal before returning to his home ground team Kelantan after the Harimau Muda program was disbanded.

Kelantan
Faris first played and the captained of Kelantan U21 team before being promoted to the senior squad during second transfer window in 2016. He made his debut for Kelantan in Malaysia Cup match against Selangor as substitute for Norhafiz Zamani in the 65th minute. His league debut for the team came on 23 July 2016 in a 0–0 draw against Pahang in Sultan Muhammad IV Stadium.

Faris was sidelined throughout 2017 season due to injury.

Melaka United
In May 2018, Faris were transferred to Melaka United.

International career
Faris is also a member and captain of the Malaysia U23 team, who were competing in the 2016 Nations Cup and the runners-up for the competition after defeated by Thailand U23 1–2 in the final.

Career statistics

Club

References

External links
 
 

Living people
1995 births
People from Kelantan
Malaysian people of Malay descent
Malaysian footballers
Kelantan FA players
Melaka United F.C. players
Penang F.C. players
Association football central defenders